The Plant That Ate Dirty Socks is a series of 9 children's novels by Nancy McArthur. The series is centered on two brothers: Michael, a messy child, and Norman, a neat freak, along with their sentient sock-eating pet plants, Stanley and Fluffy.

The eponymous first book in this series, The Plant That Ate Dirty Socks, was published in 1988 and is the most popular book written by McArthur. The book has been taught in the American school system. This often takes place during a unit on plants in the third grade, although the book has been considered a challenging read for some children in that grade. McArthur reworked this book into a play in 2000.

Titles

References

1988 American novels
American children's novels
Novels set in the United States
1988 children's books